Lynn Shackelford (born August 27, 1947) is an American former professional basketball player.

A graduate of John Burroughs High School in Burbank, California, Shackelford earned 7 varsity letters in 3 years in basketball, baseball and golf.  He was the CIF Player of the Year in basketball in 1965 for the Southern California Section.

A 6'5" forward, Shackelford played college basketball at UCLA under legendary coach John Wooden. He was one of only 4 players to have started on 3 NCAA championship teams (67, 68, 69). The others are Lew Alcindor, Curtis Rowe and Henry Bibby. He complemented his teammates as a dead eye pure shooter; most of his shots would be 3 pointers today.

Shackelford played one season in the American Basketball Association as a member of the Miami Floridians. He was later a broadcaster for ESPN, CBS, and NBC.  Additionally he spent 7 seasons broadcasting all Los Angeles Lakers games with Chick Hearn. He worked on the crew of the American game show Almost Anything Goes.

References
Basketball-reference.com stats

1947 births
Living people
American men's basketball players
Basketball players from California
College basketball announcers in the United States
Miami Floridians players
National Basketball Association broadcasters
San Diego Rockets draft picks
Small forwards
Sportspeople from Burbank, California
UCLA Bruins men's basketball players